West Branch Mohawk River may refer to the following rivers:

 West Branch Mohawk River (New Hampshire), in New Hampshire
 West Branch Mohawk River (New York), in New York